Henri Thorsen (19 October 1893 – 4 September 1977) was a Danish sprinter. He competed in the 4 × 100 metres relay at the 1920 Summer Olympics and the 1924 Summer Olympics.

References

1893 births
1977 deaths
Athletes (track and field) at the 1920 Summer Olympics
Athletes (track and field) at the 1924 Summer Olympics
Danish male sprinters
Danish male hurdlers
Olympic athletes of Denmark
Place of birth missing